Nana Yaw Konadu Yeboah (born February 15, 1964) is a Ghanaian former professional boxer who competed from 1985 to 2001. He is a world champion in two weight classes, having held the WBC super-flyweight title from 1989 to 1990, and the WBA bantamweight title twice between 1996 and 1998.

Professional career
Konadu made his professional debut on May 5, 1985. In his 15th professional bout, he defeated former champion Cesar Polanco to capture the WBC International super flyweight title.

WBC super-flyweight Title
On November 7, 1989, Konadu captured the WBC and Lineal Super Flyweight Title with a decision win over two-time champion Gilberto Roman. He lost the belt in his first defense to Sung Kil Moon by technical decision. The fight was a war with both fighters exchanging knockdowns, however, the action was stopped in the ninth round due to a headbutt and Moon was declared the winner on the scorecards. He lost a rematch to Moon in 1991 by knockout.

WBA bantamweight title
Konadu scored 15 consecutive victories over the next four years, including wins over Juan Polo Perez, former champion Victor Rabanales, and Abraham Torres.  On January 28, 1996, he became a two-division champion by capturing the WBA Bantamweight Title in a TKO victory over Veeraphol Sahaprom, who would go on to become a long-reigning champion.  He again lost the belt in his first defense to Daorung Chuvatana by a technical decision but recaptured the belt the following year in a rematch.  He defended the belt once before losing it to Johnny Tapia in 1998.  He rebounded with a win over former champion Hector Acero Sanchez and retired in 2001 after being TKO'd by Daniel Seda.  He now lives with his family in New Dormaa, Sunyani, Ghana.

Professional boxing record

See also
List of super-flyweight boxing champions
List of bantamweight boxing champions

References

External links
 
 Nana Konadu insinuates NDC is being paranoid
Nana Konadu - CBZ Profile

1964 births
Living people
Bantamweight boxers
Super-flyweight boxers
World bantamweight boxing champions
World super-flyweight boxing champions
World Boxing Association champions
World Boxing Council champions
Ghanaian male boxers
African Boxing Union champions